1920 Maraşspor, formerly Kahramanmaraş Büyükşehir Belediyespor, is a football club located in Kahramanmaraş, Turkey. The team competes in TFF Third League, having been promoted in the 2011–12 season.

Previous names
 Kahramanmaraş Belediyespor (1976–2012)
 Kahramanmaraş Büyükşehir Belediyespor (2012–2016)
 1920 Maraşspor (2012–2019)

League participation
TFF Third League: 2012–2019
Turkish Regional Amateur League: 2010–2012

Stadium
The club plays at 12 Şubat Stadium.

References

External links
1920 Maraşspor on TFF.org

TFF Third League clubs
Football clubs in Turkey